Kirby Logan Archer is an American murderer who was found adrift on September 24, 2007 in a lifeboat under circumstances that triggered suspicion. He later pleaded guilty to hijacking the fishing charter vessel the Joe Cool and participating in the murders of the vessel's crew.

Found adrift

On September 22, 2007 Archer and Guillermo Zarabozo had chartered the Joe Cool, a 47-foot Miami-based fishing charter, asking to be transported to Bimini. After the vessel failed to return to Miami on schedule, a Coast Guard rescue operation was initiated, and the Joe Cool was eventually found adrift, a deserted ghost ship. Archer and Zarabozo were found nearby in the vessel's lifeboat, with their luggage — with no sign of the vessel's crew: Jake Branam, Kelley Branam, Scott Gamble, and Samuel Kairy.

Archer's account said that the vessel was hijacked, and that the hijackers let him and Zarabozo go. Zarabozo initially gave a similar account (though he later changed his story, claiming that he was never aboard the Joe Cool, and was charged with making a false statement to law enforcement officials as a result). However, investigators suspected that Archer had chartered the vessel in order to flee an Arkansas arrest warrant, and seek asylum in Cuba, Zarabozo's native country. Archer had previously been stationed at Guantanamo Bay Naval Base while serving as a military police investigator in the United States Army.

Arkansas warrant

Archer had previously worked as the customer service manager of an Arkansas Walmart. He was accused of stealing $97,000 from the Walmart. Before Arkansas law enforcement officials could arrest him for the alleged theft, Archer fled the state, resulting in the issuance of a fugitive warrant for his arrest. Archer, who was also facing allegations of sexual-abuse against young boys in Arkansas (including his own children), made his way to Miami, where he hired the charter boat, paying cash to cover the $4,000 charge for the two-hour trip.

Arrest, guilty plea and sentence
Archer was later arrested and charged with the murders of the four crew members during the hijacking of the Joe Cool charter boat. Prosecutors alleged that Archer hijacked the boat and headed for Cuba to escape the intensifying child molestation and theft investigations in Arkansas. In July 2008, Archer pleaded guilty to first-degree murder, robbery, kidnapping and hijacking. By pleading guilty, Archer avoided a possible death sentence. On October 14, 2008, Archer was sentenced to five consecutive life terms in prison.

Archer's co-defendant, Guillermo Zarabozo, was tried on the same charges of murder, robbery, kidnapping, hijacking, and weapons charges, and was initially found guilty of firearms violations. However, the jury deadlocked on the piracy and murder counts, with some jury members believing Zarabozo's claims that the hijacking and murders had been planned and initiated by Archer, without Zarabozo's knowledge. At his retrial, Zarabozo was found guilty on 4 murder charges, and he was also given five life sentences. He was assigned BOP#79077-004 and is serving the sentence at USP Lewisburg.

References

External links

 Kelley Branam, Jake Branam:‘Dark Waters Murder In The Deep episode "Hijacked"

Living people
Criminals from Arkansas
American people convicted of murder
People convicted of murder by the United States federal government
American prisoners sentenced to life imprisonment
Prisoners sentenced to life imprisonment by the United States federal government
Hijackers
American pirates
American people convicted of kidnapping
American mass murderers
1971 births